Brent Johnson (born December 7, 1976) is a retired Canadian football defensive lineman who played for the BC Lions of the Canadian Football League (CFL). He attended Ohio State University where he played for the Buckeyes.

Professional career
Brent Johnson was drafted by the Lions in the third round, 20th overall of the 2000 CFL Draft.  He started playing for BC in 2001. Johnson led the CFL in sacks with 17 in the 2005 CFL season and 16 in the 2006 CFL season.  He won the CFL's Most Outstanding Canadian Award and was named a CFL All-Star in both years.  Johnson also won the CFL's Most Outstanding Defensive Player Award in 2006.  He was awarded his third CFL All-Star selection for his performance in the 2008 CFL season. He holds the record for sacks with the BC Lions with 89 over his 11-year career.

Personal
Brent Johnson lives in Vancouver with his wife Lara and his son Roman.

References

External links
BC Lions profile
BC's Brent Johnson calls it a career
Just Sports Stats

1976 births
Living people
Canadian people of British descent
Sportspeople from Kingston, Ontario
Players of Canadian football from Ontario
Canadian football defensive linemen
Ohio State Buckeyes football players
BC Lions players
Canadian Football League Most Outstanding Canadian Award winners
Canadian Football League Most Outstanding Defensive Player Award winners
Canadian Football Hall of Fame inductees